Gordon Roy "Gord" Buttrey (March 17, 1926 – January 3, 2012) was a Canadian professional ice hockey right wing who played ten games in the National Hockey League with the Chicago Black Hawks during the 1943–44 season. He was traded with Hec Highton and cash to bring goalie Mike Karakas back to Chicago. Buttrey spent most of his career, which lasted from 1943 to 1956, in the minor leagues. He was born in Regina, Saskatchewan and died in Edmonton, Alberta.

Career statistics

Regular season and playoffs

External links
 

1926 births
2012 deaths
Atlantic City Sea Gulls (EHL) players
Canadian ice hockey right wingers
Chicago Blackhawks players
Edmonton Flyers (WHL) players
Indianapolis Chiefs players
Milwaukee Clarks players
Philadelphia Falcons players
Portland Eagles players
Providence Reds players
Saskatoon Quakers players
Sportspeople from Regina, Saskatchewan
Troy Bruins players
20th-century Canadian people